The Società Storica Lombarda (‘Lombardy Historical Society’) is a historical and humanistic association which was founded in 1873. It has 450 members from all over Italy.

References
Official site, home page

1873 establishments in Italy
Historical societies of Italy
Lombardy
Organizations established in 1873